Carol Iovanna (born March 2, 1952) is a former newscaster on Fox News from 1996 to 2006. She often did the headlines in the late night hours during the weekends. Before Fox, she worked at WCBS-TV and WABC-TV. Iovanna also anchored the news on Live with Regis and Kathie Lee.

Iovanna was originally an anchor on the now-defunct Satellite News Channel (1982–83). After SNC folded, Iovanna, who began her broadcasting career in radio, joined WABC-TV in New York City. She lives in Stamford, Connecticut. She left Fox News in 2006 and started a television programming company, Illumination Productions, and serves as president and executive producer.

External links
Illumination Productions

American women in business
New York (state) television reporters
Television anchors from New York City
American television journalists
American broadcast news analysts
People from Stamford, Connecticut
1952 births
Living people
American mass media company founders
American women television journalists
21st-century American women